This is a list of prime ministers of Somalia. The prime minister of Somalia is the head of government of Somalia. There have been 22 official prime ministers since the office was created in 1956. The first prime minister was Abdullahi Issa, who served prior to independence in the Trust Territory of Somaliland. The current prime minister of the Federal Republic of Somalia is Hamza Abdi Barre, approved by the House of the People on 25 June 2022.

List

Somali prime ministers are given a new number even when they are reappointed. For example, former prime minister Omar Sharmarke wrote on his Twitter page, "13th and 18th Prime Minister of Somalia." The seat had long been vacant since Umar Ghalib stepped down as prime minister, but Ali Khalif Galaydh became the eighth in August 2000. The acting prime minister is not numbered. For example, Osman Jama Ali was acting prime minister between Ali Khalif Galaydh, the eighth, and Hassan Abshir Farah, the ninth, he didn't get a number. In June 2022, Hamza Abdi Barre succeeded the 20th Mohamed Hussein Roble as the 21st Prime Minister.

Timeline

See also

Somalia
Politics of Somalia
List of colonial governors of British Somaliland
List of colonial governors of Italian Somaliland
President of Somalia
List of presidents of Somalia
Speaker of Somali Parliament
Lists of office-holders
List of current heads of state and government

Notes

References

References
World Statesmen – Somalia

Somalia

Prime ministers
1960 establishments in Somalia
Politics of Somalia
Government of Somalia